The Comrades Marathon is an ultramarathon of approximately  which is run annually in the KwaZulu-Natal province of South Africa between the cities of Durban and Pietermaritzburg. It is the world's largest and oldest ultramarathon race. The direction of the race alternates each year between the "up" run (87 km) starting from Durban and the "down" run (now 90.184 km) starting from Pietermaritzburg.

The 2019 field was capped at 25,000 runners, and the entry process closed after one week. South African runners constitute the greater part of the field, but many entrants hail from the United Kingdom, Zimbabwe, India, the United States, Brazil, Australia, Botswana, Russia and Eswatini. In all but three runnings since 1988, over 10,000 runners have reached the finish within the allowed 11 or 12 hours. With increased participation since the 1980s, the average finish times for both sexes, and the average age of finishers have increased substantially.

The race was not held from 1941 to 1945 due to World War II, and the in-person edition of the race was cancelled in 2020 and 2021 due to the coronavirus pandemic. It was resumed in 2022 with a field of 15,000 entrants.

Since 2019 runners over the age of 20 qualify when they are able to complete an officially recognised marathon (42.2 km) in under 4:50 (5 hours before 2019). During the event an athlete must also reach five cut-off points in specified times to complete the race. The spirit of the Comrades Marathon is said to be embodied by attributes of camaraderie, selflessness, dedication, perseverance, and ubuntu.

Course

The race is run on the roads of KwaZulu-Natal province, marked by "The Big Five" set of hills. On the up run they appear in the following order: Cowies Hill, Fields Hill, Botha's Hill, Inchanga, and Polly Shortts. Approximately 40 official refreshment stations along the route are stocked with soft drinks, water sachets, energy drink sachets, fruit, biscuits, energy bars, cooked potatoes and other refreshments. About eight physiotherapy and first aid stations are also located at strategic points.

Rules
Athletes currently have 12 hours to complete the course, extended from 11 hours in 2003 (including a special 12 hour allowance in the year 2000). The original Comrades cut-off time from 1921 to 1927 was also 12 hours, reduced to 11 hours in 1928.  There are a number of cut-off points along the routes which runners must reach by a prescribed time or be forced to retire from the race. A runner who successfully completed nine marathons wears a yellow number, while those who completed ten races wear a green number, permanently allocated to the runner for all future races. Runners running their 20th, 30th and 40th races are also indicated by yellow numbers – differently formatted on different years.

Medals are awarded to all runners completing the course in under 12 hours. Medals are currently awarded as follows:

 Gold medal: the first 10 men and women.
 Wally Hayward medal (silver-centred circled by gold ring): 11th position to sub 6hrs 00min.
 Isavel Roche-Kelly medal (silver-centred circled by gold ring): women only, 11th position to sub 7hrs 30min.
 Silver medal: 6hrs 00min to sub 7hrs 30min.
 Bill Rowan medal (bronze-centred circled by silver ring): 7hrs 30min to sub 9hrs 00min.
Robert Mtshali medal (titanium): 9hr 00min to sub 10hrs 00min.
 Bronze medal: 10hrs 00min to sub 11hrs 00min.
 Vic Clapham medal (copper): 11hrs 00min to sub 12hrs 00min.

- Prior to 2000, only gold, silver and bronze medals were awarded.

- The Bill Rowan medal was introduced in 2000 and named after the winner of the first Comrades Marathon in 1921. The time limit for this medal was inspired by Rowan's winning time in 1921 of 8hrs 59min.

- A new copper medal, the Vic Clapham medal (named after the race founder), was added in 2003. This medal coincided with the increase in the time allocation for completing the event from sub 11hrs to sub 12hrs.

- The Wally Hayward medal, named after five-time winner Wally Hayward, was added in 2007 for runners finishing in under 6hrs, but outside the gold medals. Often there are fewer runners earning a Wally Hayward medal than those earning a gold medal, if any at all.

- In 2005 the back-to-back medal was created and henceforth was awarded to novice runners who complete an 'up or down run' in succession. Back-to-back medals were automatically awarded to 2005 Comrades Marathon finishers who had completed their first Comrades Marathon in 2004. As with any new innovation, the award was never intended to be retrospective, owing to administrative restrictions. However, in response to popular demand, the back-to-back medal is available for purchase to runners who have previously fulfilled the criteria of completing both an 'up' and a 'down' Comrades Marathon.

- For 2019 the Isavel Roche-Kelly medal (the same design as the Wally Hayward medal) was introduced for women finishing outside the gold medals, but under 7hrs 30min, effectively eliminating the silver medal for women. Twenty-year old Isavel Roche-Kelly was named the UCT Sportsperson of the Year for 1980. An unknown on the athletics scene, Roche-Kelly set the roads alight that year when she became the first woman to break the 7-hour barrier and win the Comrades Marathon in 7:18:00; well under the silver-medal cut-off of 7:30:00, and in the process shattering the women's record by more than an hour.  Earlier that year she also became only the third women in Africa to complete a marathon in under three hours. She went on to win the 1981 Comrades up run in a time of 6:44:35 the following year. Three years later she died in a cycling accident in her native Northern Ireland at the age of 24.

- Also in 2019, the titanium Robert Mtshali medal was introduced for a time between 9hrs 00min and sub 10hrs 00min.  Robert Mtshali was the first unofficial black runner in the 1935 Comrades Marathon, finishing his race in a time of 9 hours and 30 minutes. His efforts were not officially recorded as government and race rules of the time stipulated that, in order to compete in the Comrades Marathon, you had to be a white male.  Friday, 24 May 1935, saw Mtshali participating in the 15th Comrades Marathon, a down run, joining the 48 official entrants on the starting line. He ran unofficially, but was warmly welcomed into the Durban finish venue on the then Old Fort Road track grounds (now KE Masinga Road) by the crowds of supporters and spectators.  The maverick runner clocked his time of 9:30 and was awarded a special presentation by Councilor V.L. Shearer. He was one of only 35 finishers.

History

The Comrades was run for the first time on 24 May 1921 (Empire Day), and with the exception of a break during World War II, as well as the COVID-19 pandemic-impacted 2020, has been run every year since. To date, over 300,000 runners have completed the race.

The race was the idea of World War I veteran Vic Clapham, to commemorate the South African soldiers killed during the war. Clapham, who had endured a 2,700-kilometre route march through sweltering German East Africa, wanted the memorial to be a unique test of the physical endurance of the entrants. The constitution of the race states that one of its primary aims is to "celebrate mankind's spirit over adversity". Vic Clapham's great-grandson, Antony Clapham, finished the race from 2012 to 2015, earning four Vic Clapham medals.

From 1962 to 1994 the race was run on Republic Day, 31 May. After this public holiday was scrapped in 1995 by the post-apartheid South African government, the race date was changed to Youth Day on 16 June. In 2007, the race organisers (controversially) bowed to political pressure from the ANC Youth League, who felt that the race diverted attention from the significance of Youth Day, and changed the race date to Sunday 17 June for 2007 and 15 June for 2008. In 2009 and 2010 the date was changed (to 24 May and 30 May respectively) to accommodate football's Confederations Cup (2009) and World Cup (2010) in South Africa.  In 2020, the race was cancelled due to the coronavirus pandemic.

1920s
Forty-eight runners entered the first race in 1921, but only thirty-four elected to start. Most of them were former infantrymen. The course at the time was tarred only for the final few kilometres into Durban. A time limit of 12 hours was set and Bill Rowan became the inaugural winner, clocking 08:59 to win by 41 minutes ahead of Harry Phillips. Of the 34 starters, only 16 completed the race.

Arthur Newton entered and won the race for the first time in 1922. He went on to win the race five times and emerge as the dominant Comrades runner of the 1920s. When he completed the down run in 06:56 in 1923, there were only a handful of spectators on hand to witness the finish because so few thought it possible that the race could be run so quickly. The first woman to run the race was Frances Hayward in 1923, but her entry was refused, so she was an unofficial entrant. She completed the event in 11:35 and although she was not awarded a Comrades medal, the other runners and spectators presented her with a silver tea service and a rose bowl. In 1924 the Comrades had its fewest starters ever, just 24. Four years later, in 1928, the time limit for the race was reduced by an hour to 11 hours.

1930s
In the 1930s, Hardy Ballington emerged as the dominant runner, recording four victories in 1933, 1934, 1936 and 1938. The winner of the 1930 race, Wally Hayward, became one of the greatest legends of the Comrades Marathon, winning a further four times in the fifties, and becoming the oldest man to complete the race in 1989. In 1932 Geraldine Watson, an unofficial entrant, became the first woman to complete both the up run and the down run.

1940s
After Ballington's domination of the 1930s, Comrades was stopped during the war years from 1941 to 1945. In 1948 a Comrades tradition was born when race official Max Trimborn, instead of firing the customary starter's gun, gave a loud imitation of a cock's crow. That tradition continues to the present day with Trimborn's recorded voice played over loudspeakers at the starting line.

1950s
In the 1950s, a full twenty years after he won the race for the first time, Wally Hayward recorded his second victory and followed that up with wins in 1951, 1953 and 1954. He represented South Africa at the 1952 Olympic Games in Helsinki, where he finished tenth in the marathon. Hayward retired from the Comrades after establishing new records for both the up and down runs and equaling the five wins of Newton and Ballington. In 1958, the race was won for the first time by Jackie Mekler, who went on to win the race five times, finishing second twice and third twice.

1960s
In the 1960s, Comrades grew considerably, from 104 starters in 1960 to 703 starters in 1969. Due to the bigger fields, cut-off points were introduced at Drummond and Cato Ridge. Mekler became the first man to break the six-hour barrier in 1960, finishing in 5:56:32. The 1961 winner was George Claassen, a school principal and father of well-known Wynand Claassen, Springbok rugby captain during 1981–83. Claassen junior also finished the Comrades ten times in later years.

In 1962, the race attracted foreign entries for the first time as the Road Runners Club of England sent over four of the best long-distance runners in Britain. English runner John Smith won the race, an up run, in under six hours, missing out on the course record by 33 seconds. Watching the stragglers come in hours later, Smith commented to former winner Bill Cochrane that the other people completing the race were getting as much applause as he had received. "You are now witnessing the spirit of the Comrades," replied Cochrane.

In 1965, English runner Bernard Gomersall broke Mekler's down run record with a time of 5:51:09.

In 1967, Manie Kuhn and Tommy Malone were involved in the closest finish in the history of the race. Malone appeared to be on his way to a comfortable win and was handed the traditional message from the Mayor of Pietermaritzburg to the Mayor of Durban at Tollgate with a lead of two minutes over Kuhn. He entered the stadium in the lead with only 80 metres left to go. Suddenly Kuhn appeared only 15 metres behind and closed in quickly. Malone put in a burst for the line, but with only 15 metres left he fell to the ground with cramps. He attempted to get up again, but with the line within reach Kuhn flew past to grab victory. The mayoral message was forgotten as both runners embraced.

1970s
The Comrades had over 1,000 starters for the first time in 1971, with over 3,000 in 1979. The race was widely broadcast on both radio and television. The race was opened to all athletes for the first time in 1975, allowing blacks and women to take part officially. In 1975, the Golden Jubilee of the Comrades, Vincent Rakabele finished 20th to become the first black runner to officially win a medal. Elizabeth Cavanaugh became the first women's winner in a shade over 10 hours.

1976 saw the emergence of Alan Robb, who won the first of his four Comrades titles. Robb repeated his win in 1977, 1978 and 1980, including breaking the tape in Durban in 1978 in a record 5:29:14, almost 20 minutes and four kilometres ahead of runner-up Dave Wright.

1980s

During the 1980s the Comrades began with a field of 4,207 in 1980 and topped 5,000 for the first time in 1983.

In 1980, Olive Anthony became the first black woman finisher of the race in 9:10. She ran the race 22 times, including in 1983 while she was three months pregnant and also in 2010 with her husband and two daughters.

In 1981, University of the Witwatersrand student Bruce Fordyce won the first of his eventual nine Comrades titles. An outspoken critic of apartheid, Fordyce and a number of other athletes initially decided to boycott the 1981 event when organisers announced that they would associate it with the 20th anniversary of the Republic of South Africa. Fordyce ultimately competed wearing a black armband to signal his protest. He repeated his victories in 1982, 1983, 1984, 1985, 1986 (a record 5:24:07 down run), 1987, 1988 (a record 5:27:42 for the up run), and 1990.

In 1989, Sam Tshabalala became the first black winner of the Comrades.

Schoolteacher Frith van der Merwe won the woman's race in 1988 in a time of 6:32:56. In 1989, Van der Merwe ran 5:54:43, obliterating the women's record and finishing fifteenth overall.

In the same year Wally Hayward entered the race at the age of 79 and finished in 9:44:15. He repeated the feat in the 1989 Comrades, where he completed the race with only two minutes to spare and at the age of 80 became the oldest man to complete the Comrades.

1990s

During the 1990s the size of the starting fields was in the region of 12,000 to 14,000 runners. In 1995 prize money was introduced, attracting more foreign competitors. The traditional race day of 31 May, formerly Republic Day, was changed to 16 June, the anniversary of the Soweto uprising.

In 1992 Charl Mattheus, crossed the finish line first, but was later disqualified after testing positive for a banned substance. He claimed it was contained in medicine he had taken for a sore throat, but Jetman Msutu was elevated to the winner, thus becoming the second black winner of the Comrades. In a sad twist for Mattheus, not long after the 1992 race, the substance for which he was banned was removed from the IAAF's banned substance list since all evidence pointed to it having no performance enhancing properties. Mattheus also suffered much negativity in the public eye but later managed to redeem his clean image with an emphatic faultless win in the 1997 down run beating a strong local and international field.

2000s
The 75th anniversary of the Comrades Marathon in 2000 was the largest ever staged, with a massive field of 23,961. An extra hour was allowed to allow runners some recovery time for bronze medal finishers to celebrate the milestone. In 2010, on its 85th anniversary, the race gained a place in the Guinness World Records as the ultramarathon with most runners. 14,343 athletes, the largest field since the turn of the millennium, finished in the allowed 12 hours.

Russian runner Leonid Shvetsov set both down and up course records in 2007 and 2008, respectively.  Stephen Muzhingi became the first non-South African winner from Africa in 2009.

2010s 

Russian identical twin sisters Olesya and Elena Nurgalieva won a combined ten Comrades titles from 2003 to 2013.  Stephen Muzhingi also became the first athlete to win three races in a row (2009, 2010 and 2011) since Bruce Fordyce won three in a row in the eighties (1981, 1982 and 1983).

South African supremacy over the men's race was restored when Ludwick Mamabolo won the down run in 2012. David Gatebe shattered the men's down record in 2016, while Bongmusa Mthembu has won three titles. Among the women, the Nurgalieva twins hold on the race was finally broken in 2014 when Ellie Greenwood, GBR, won the downrun after a spectacular finish, taking the lead just 2 km before the end. In 2015 Caroline Wostmann became the first South African woman to win Comrades in 17 years, followed by Charne Bosman in 2016 and Ann Ashworth in 2018. In 2017, American Camille Herron, led from start-to-finish to become only the 3rd American and first in 20 years to win.

2020s 

The 2020 in-person edition of the race was cancelled due to the coronavirus pandemic, with foreign registrants given the option of transferring their entry to 2021 or 2022. Similarly, the 2021 in-person edition of the race was also cancelled due to the pandemic.

The 2022 Comrades down run was the first in-person event following the Covid-19 pandemic. It was the 95th event since its inception in 1921, and the apt event slogan was "The Return – Sishay' Ibuya". Legislation concerning mass participation events limited the number of entrants to 15,000, and preference was given to those who had entered the cancelled 2020 race. The KwaZulu-Natal Sports Department confirmed that 2 athletes died following the race.

Health issues
As with every ultramarathon, there are potentially lethal health risks involved in extreme physical events. In the history of the Comrades, there have been 8 deaths up to the 2022 event. In a survey among a sample of 2005 participants, 25% reported cramps, 18% nausea, 8% vomiting, 13% dizziness, 3% diarrhoea, 23% pain, excluding the expected sore legs, and 14% reported fatigue of such a nature that they believed themselves to be incapable of continuing the race. Among silver medalists there was a higher incidence of cramps (42.9%), nausea (21.4%) and diarrhoea (7.1%), though a lower incidence of pain and fatigue than the average runner.

Cheating in the race
In 1993, Herman Matthee, a runner from Bellville athletics club, finished in 7th place and was one of the top ten gold medal winners, but he was later stripped of his gold medal and disqualified when video evidence and eyewitness testimony indicated that he entered the race at Kloof and completed less than 30 km of the 89 km down run. As his surname resembled that of top runner Charl Mattheus, he was often mistaken by the public as being the same person, unfairly tainting the image of the 1992 disqualified champion. Consequently, in a Comrades first, 11th-place finisher Simon Williamson was months later promoted to tenth place and awarded the last gold medal by the then South African president FW de Klerk. Williamson had passed another runner, Ephraim Sekothlong, in the last 100 metres to claim 11th spot and, unknowingly, a gold medal.

In 1999, the Motsoeneng brothers from Bethlehem, Free State, who strongly resembled one another, performed an act of cheating during another down run. By exchanging places with his brother at toilet stops and aided by car lifts at various stages, Sergio Motsoeneng finished ninth, which came as a surprise to Nick Bester and other athletes behind him, who could not recall being overtaken. They were exposed when television footage revealed them to be wearing watches on different arms, and a time pad reading that confirmed that one of the brothers was still trailing Bester at Botha's Hill. The brothers performed well in later years, though Sergio tested positive for a banned substance after finishing third in 2010.

Use of banned substances is claimed to be endemic among top Comrades athletes, but only a small number have been disqualified. Runners who have tested positive include Sergio Motsoeneng, Rasta Mohloli, Viktor Zhdanov, Lephetesang Adoro and Ludwick Mamabolo. Mamabolo was found not guilty due to "technical irregularities". Erythropoietin (EPO), norandrosterone (a metabolite or precursor of nandrolone), methylhexaneamine and testosterone have been mentioned in connection with Comrades athletes.

In 2014, an analysis of negative splits by runner and statistician Mark Dowdeswell, suggested that a number of runners in the middle to back half of the field may be taking shortcuts.

Records and statistics

10 Fastest times (up & down runs)

 Year: Athlete: Time: Nation: Position that year 
 

 Up – Men 
	2008	 Leonid Shvetsov 	5.24.39	1st
	2000	 Vladimir Kotov 	5.25.33	1st
	1998	 Dmitri Grishin 	5.26.25	1st
	2000	 Alexi Volgin 	5.27.08	2nd
	1988	 Bruce Fordyce 	5.27.42	1st
	1996	 Dmitri Grishin 	5.29.33	1st
	1983	 Bruce Fordyce 	5.30.12	1st
	1996	 Nick Bester 	5.30.48	2nd
	2002	 Vladimir Kotov 	5.30.59	1st
	2004	 Vladimir Kotov 	5.31.22	1st

 

 Up – Women 
	2019	 Gerda Steyn 5.58.53	1st
	2006	 Elena Nurgalieva 	6.09.24	1st
	2004	 Elena Nurgalieva 	6.11.15	1st
	2015	 Caroline Wöstmann 	6.12.22	1st
	2006	 Marina Zhalybina 	6.12.58	2nd
	1996	 Ann Trason 	6.13.23	1st
	2004	 Marina Zhalybina 	6.14.13	2nd
	2002	 Maria Bak      	6.14.21	1st
	2008	 Elena Nurgalieva 	6.14.37	1st
	2008	 Olesya Nurgalieva 	6.15.52	2nd

 

 Down -	Men 
	2016	 David Gatebe 	5.18.19	1st
	2007	 Leonid Shvetsov 	5.20.41	1st
	2009	 Stephen Muzhingi 	5.23.27	1st
	2016	 Ludwick Mamabolo 	5.24.05	2nd
	1986	 Bruce Fordyce 	5.24.07	1st
	2001	 Andrew Kelehe 	5.25.52	1st
	1986	 Bob de la Motte 	5.26.12	2nd
	2001	 Leonid Shvetsov 	5.26.29	2nd
	2018	 Bongmusa Mthembu 	5.26.34	1st
	2016	 Bongmusa Mthembu 	5.26.39	3rd

  
 

 Down -	Women 
	1989	 Frith van der Merwe 	5.54.43	1st
	1997	 Ann Trason 	5.58.25	1st
	2005	 Tatyana Zhirkova 	5.58.51	1st
	1997	 Maria Bak 	6.00.28	2nd
	2012	 Elena Nurgalieva 	6.07.12	1st
	2003	 Elena Nurgalieva 	6.07.47	1st
	1991	 Frith van der Merwe 	6.08.19	1st
	2012	 Eleanor Greenwood 	6.08.24	2nd
	2007	 Olesya Nurgalieva 	6.10.03	1st
	2018	 Ann Ashworth 	6.10.04	1st

Multiple winners
'+' denotes winner of both an up and a down run

Most gold medals
Gold medals were first awarded in 1931, and to the first 6 male finishers.  In 1972, this was extended to the first 10 male finishers, as it is today.  In 1983 a gold medal was awarded to the female winner for the first time.  In 1988, this was extended to the first 3 female finishers, then to the first 5 female finishers from 1995, and from 1998 onward to the first 10 female finishers, on par with the male race.

The following runners won 7 or more gold medals, gold medal span in brackets:

Men

12 medals  
 Alan Robb (1974–1991)

11 medals  
 Bruce Fordyce (1979–1990)

10 medals  
 Trevor Allen (1950–1961)

 Jackie Mekler (1952–1969)

 Shaun Meiklejohn (1989–1999)

 Andrew Kelehe (1997–2006)

 Fusi Nhlapo (2000–2012)

9 medals  
  Hoseah Tjale (1980–1990)

 Nick Bester (1988–1997)

 Stephen Muzhingi (2007–2015)

 Bongmusa Mthembu (2009–2022)

8 medals  
 Allen Boyce (1936–1956)

 Gordon Baker (1967–1974)

7 medals  
 Hardy Ballington (1932–1947)

 Gerald Walsh (1952–1960)

 Charl Mattheus (1988–1998)

 Oleg Kharitonov (2002–2008)

/ Vladimir Kotov (2000–2008)

 Mncedisi Mkhize (2006–2016)

 Claude Moshiywa (2005–2016)

 Ludwick Mamobolo (2010–2017)

Women

13 medals  
 Elena Nurgalieva (2003–2015)

12 medals  
 Marina Zhalybina (1999–2013)

11 medals  
 Maria Bak (1995–2008)

10 medals  
 Farwa Mentoor (2002–2011)

 Olesya Nurgalieva (2003–2015)

9 medals  
 Valentina Shatyayeva (1994–2002)

 Yolande Maclean (2003–2022)

7 medals  
 Grace De Oliveira (1999–2007)

Most top 10 finishes by women
The following women have finished in the top 10 of the women's race on 7 or more occasions in the race history. Given the top 10 women only received gold medals from 1998, the gold medals list doesn't fully reflect the history of the women's race as female contenders in the 1980s and early 90s were competing for fewer gold medals relative to the men.

13 top ten  

 Elena Nurgalieva (2003–2015)

12 top ten  

 Marina Zhalybina (1999–2013)

11 top ten  

 Maria Bak (1995–2008)

10 top ten  

 Farwa Mentoor (2002–2011)
 
 Olesya Nurgalieva (2003–2015)

9 top ten  

 Tilda Tearle (1986–1995)

 Valentina Shatyayeva (1994–2002)

 Yolande Maclean (2003–2022)

8 top ten  

 Priscilla Carlisle (1981–1989)

 Ralie Smit (1980–1989)

 Hazel Hairs (1983–1990)

7 top ten  

 Sanet Beukes (1992–1998)

 Grace De Oliveira (1999–2007)

International (non-African) gold medalists
The following non-African international runners have won 2 or more gold medals:

Men

7 medals  
 Oleg Kharitonov (2002–2008)

 Vladimir Kotov (2000–2008)

6 medals  
 Alexi Volgin (1995–2001)

5 medals  
 Jaroslaw Janicki (1997–2008)

 Grigory Murzin (1999–2008)

 Leonid Schvetsov (2001–2012)

4 medals  
 Dmitri Grishin (1996–2001)

3 medals  
 Dave Levick (1971–1975)

 Jorge Aubeso (2002–2004)

 Jonas Buud (2011–2014)

2 medals  
 Mick Orton (1972–1973)

 John McBrearty (1973–1975)

 Charly Doll (1993–1994)

 Peter Camenzind (1994–1997)

 Konstantin Santalov (1997–1999)

 Mikhail Kokorev (1996–2000)

 Anatoliy Korepanov (1999–2000)

 Don Wallace (2000–2002)

/ Steve Way (2017–2018)

Women

13 medals  
 Elena Nurgalieva (2003–2015)

12 medals  
 Marina Zhalybina (1999–2013)

11 medals  
 Maria Bak (1995–2008)

10 medals  
 Olesya Nurgalieva (2003–2015)

9 medals  
 Valentina Shatyayeva (1994–2002)

6 medals  
 Tatiana Zhirkova (2003–2009)

 Marina Myshlyanova (2005–2010)

5 medals  
 Elvira Kolpakova (2000–2005)

4 medals  
 Valentina Liakhova (1994–1998)

/ Ellie Greenwood (2011–2015)

 Alexandra Morozova (2017–2022)

3 medals  
/ Joasia Zakrzewski (2012–2015)

 Devon Yanko (2012–2018)

 Sarah Bard (2016–2018)

2 medals  
 Ann Trason (1996–1997)

 Birgit Lennartz (1999–2000)

 Maria Venancio (1999–2001)

 Alena Vinitskaya (2003–2007)

 Kami Semick (2010–2011)

/ Lizzy Hawker (2010–2011)

 Natalia Volgina (2002–2012)

 Simona Staicu (2003–2015)

 Camille Herron (2017–2022)

 Dominika Stelmach (2019–2022)

Most Wally Hayward medals
The following have won 3 or more Wally Hayward medals (for running sub-6 hours, but outside the top 10) since the medal was first awarded in 2007, medal span in brackets.

4 medals
 Mike Fokoroni (2012–2018)

3 medals
 Peter Muthubi (2009–2016)

 Harmans Mokgadi (2012–2016)

 Thabo Nkuna (2014–2017)

 Prodigal Khumalo (2010–2018)

 Charles Dibate Tjiane (2012–2018)

 Teboho Sello (2012–2022)

Oldest finisher
 Wally Hayward – 1989, 80 years. In 1954, winning Comrades for the fifth time, Hayward also was the oldest runner on the day, at the age of 45.

Permanent green numbers    
When a runner completes their 10th Comrades (or achieves either 5 gold medals or 3 wins) they attain their green number and keep their race number for life, the race number effectively being 'retired' only for use by that athlete.  The first time a number is awarded it will be flanked by single laurels.  After 20 years a double green number with double laurels is earned, followed by another laurel every next 10 years. A 3-time winner or 5 gold qualifier will not get a second green until they reach 20.  The race number may subsequently only be inherited by family members.

The following are holders (either earned or inherited) of race numbers 1 to 10:

 Clive Crawley – 42 medals (1957–2000) (1 , 22 , 19 )

 Wally Hayward – 5 wins/7 medals (1930–1989) (4 , 1 , 2 ) / Steven Bure – 3 medals (2015–2018) (1 , 3 Bill Rowan)

 Allen Bodill – 10 medals (1947–1968) (10 ) / Myles Bodill – 2 medals (1989–1994) (2 )

 Nick Raubenheimber – 22 medals (1953–1975) (6 , 13 , 3 ) / Graham Raubenheimer – 11 medals (1980–1995) (4 , 6 ) / Blake Raubenheimer – 10 medals (2005–2017) (9 , 1 Bill Rowan)

 Allan Ferguson – 36 medals (1948–1995) (3 , 12 , 21 )

 John Woods – 11 medals (1952–1979) (1 , 8 , 2 )

 Malcolm Hean – 14 medals (1962–1976) (9 , 5 )

 unknown/not allocated – according to results it was used in 1922 by a 'Boyle', thereafter by 7 different individuals, the final being a 'Natasha Williams' in 1995.

 Jackie Mekler – 5 wins/12 medals (1952–1985) (10 , 1 , 1 )

 Fred Morrison – 11 medals (1938–1966) (2 , 9 )

Most medals – Green number records

Male quadruple green numbers

No female runner has achieved a quadruple green number yet.

Female triple green numbers

International double green numbers

  John Sneddon, 28 medals (1993-2022)

  Klaus Neumann, 27 medals (1993-2022)

  Bruce Matthews, 20 medals (1967-2001)

  Tiago Dionisio, 20 medals (2001-2022)

  Hideo Takano, 20 medals (1999-2022)

Most consecutive medals

Winners 
Key:

Waypoints

First South African

As the race has grown in profile globally, and since the end of sporting isolation, international runners have come to dominate the race for periods of time. As a result, the first South African home each year is also now awarded a separate prize.

The following have had the distinction of being the first male and female South African across the finish line (overall finishing position in brackets), in years where the winner was an international runner:

Men
 2011 Fanie Matshipa, Samcor Marathon Club PE, (2nd)
 2010 Ludwick Mamabolo, Maxed Elite CGA, (2nd)
 2009 Charles Tjiane, Maxed Elite CGA, (3rd)
 2008 Harmans Mokgadi, Nedbank Running Club GN, (6th)
 2007 Mncedisi Mkhize, Maxed Elite CGA, (3rd)
 2006 Brian Zondi, Harmony AC CG, (2nd)
 2004 Willie Mtolo, Harmony AC CG, (4th)
 2002 Willie Mtolo, Harmony AC CG, (2nd)
 2000 Donovan Wright, Maxed Elite PE, (4th)
 1999 Andrew Kelehe, Rentmeester Fattis & Monis WP, (2nd)
 1998 Charl Mattheus, Rentmeester Fattis & Monis WP, (2nd)
 1996 Nick Bester, Tuks Road Runners Club, (2nd)
 1994 Nick Bester, Tuks Road Runners Club, (2nd)
 1993 Theo Rafiri, club unknown, (2nd)
 1972 Dave Bagshaw, Savages AC, (2nd)
 1965 Jackie Mekler, Germiston Callies Harriers, (2nd)
 1962 Jackie Mekler, Germiston Callies Harriers, (2nd)

Women
 2022 Adele Broodryk, Murray & Roberts AC NW, (3rd)
 2017 Charné Bosman, Nedbank Running Club GN, (2nd)
 2014 Caroline Wostmann, Nedbank Running Club GN, (6th)
 2013 Charné Bosman, Bonitas AC CG, (5th)
 2012 Kerry Koen, Bonitas AC CG, (4th)
 2011 Farwa Mentoor, Bonitas AC CG, (5th)
 2010 Farwa Mentoor, Bonitas AC CG, (5th)
 2009 Farwa Mentoor, Bonitas AC CG, (5th)
 2008 Riana van Niekerk, Maxed Elite CGA, (6th)
 2007 Farwa Mentoor, Harmony AC GN, (4th)
 2006 Farwa Mentoor, Harmony AC GN, (6th)
 2005 Farwa Mentoor, Harmony AC GN, (4th)
 2004 Farwa Mentoor, Harmony AC GN, (3rd)
 2003 Farwa Mentoor, Harmony AC GN, (8th)
 2002 Farwa Mentoor, Adidas AC, (4th)
 2001 Deborah Mattheus, Harmony AC GW, (2nd)
 2000 Grace de Oliveira, Maxed Elite KZN, (3rd)
 1999 Grace de Oliveira, Maxed Elite KZN, (2nd)
 1997 Charlotte Noble, club unknown, (5th)
 1996 Jowaine Parrott, Tygervalley Bellville AC, (4th)
 1995 Helene Joubert, Agape AC GN, (2nd)
 1994 Sanet Beukes, Westville AC, (4th)

Medals and demographics
There is a lot of prestige associated with a Comrades Marathon Green Number. As a result, many athletes aim to complete at least 10 races, which is evident as a clear peak in the distribution of medal counts. The introduction of the back-to-back medal (for running two years in succession) resulted in another peak for athletes with 2 medals.

Charts

Popular culture
The Long Run was a 2001 film set in 1999, in which a retired running coach trains a woman for the race. 'Comrades' was a 2008 film about seven diverse runners attempting the race.

Notes

References

External links

 Comrades Marathon Association
 Comrades tables
 Detailed profile of the 2009 Comrades route (PDF)
 The Long Run. A movie about the Comrades marathon
 The Comrades marathon, by Brad Morgan
 The Famous Comrades Marathon, by Amby Burfoot (Account of the 2007 race)
 1920 – 1925: A Soldier's Dream
 FT article

Ultramarathons
Recurring sporting events established in 1921
Marathons in South Africa
Sport in KwaZulu-Natal
June sporting events
Pietermaritzburg
Sports competitions in Durban